The 2008–09 season was the 106th in the history of the Southern League, which is an English football competition featuring semi-professional and amateur clubs from the South West, South Central and Midlands of England and South Wales.

At the end of the season Division One Midlands was renamed Division One Central.

Premier Division
The Premier Division consisted of 22 clubs, including 17 clubs from the previous season and five new clubs:
Two clubs promoted from Division One Midlands:
Evesham United
Stourbridge

Two clubs promoted from Division One South & West:
Farnborough
Oxford City

Plus:
Cambridge City, relegated from the Conference South

Corby Town won the Premier Division and along with play-off winners Gloucester City got a place in the Conference North next year.

Mangotsfield United, Yate Town and Hitchin Town relegated to the divisions One, while Banbury United were reprieved from relegation after two Conference South clubs folded.

League table

Play-offs

Results

Stadia and locations

Division One Midlands
Division One Midlands consisted of 22 clubs, including 14 clubs from previous season and eight new clubs:
Three clubs transferred from Isthmian League Division North:
AFC Sudbury
Arlesey Town
Bury Town

Plus:
Atherstone Town, promoted from the Midland Alliance
Bromsgrove Rovers, relegated from the Premier Division
Marlow, transferred from Division South & West
Nuneaton Town, demoted from the Conference South
Soham Town Rangers, promoted from the Eastern Counties League

Nuneaton Borough, finished 7th in the Conference North went into liquidation due to financial difficulties, were immediately reformed under the name Nuneaton Town and placed two divisions below in Midlands division.

Leamington won the division in the second attempt and got a place in Premier Division along with play-off winners Nuneaton Town. Dunstable and Malvern finished bottom of the table and were relegated to the lower leagues. At the end of the season Division One Midlands was renamed Division One Central.

League table

Play-offs

Results

Stadia and locations

Division One South & West
Division One South & West consisted of 22 clubs, including 15 clubs from previous season and seven new clubs:
 AFC Totton, promoted from the Wessex League
 Beaconsfield SYCOB, promoted from the Spartan South Midlands League
 Bishops Cleeve, transferred from Midlands Division
 Cinderford Town, transferred from Midlands Division
 Cirencester Town, relegated from Premier Division
 North Leigh, promoted from the Hellenic League
 Truro City, promoted from the Western League

Truro City won the division in an inaugural season and got a place in Premier Division along with play-off winners Didcot Town. Bracknell Town finished second bottom but were reprieved from relegation due to higher league clubs' problems. Winchester City finished bottom of the table and were relegated to the lower league.

League table

Play-offs

Results

Stadia and locations

League Cup

Preliminary round

First round

Second round

Third round

Quarterfinals

Semifinals

Final

See also
Southern Football League
2008–09 Isthmian League
2008–09 Northern Premier League

References 

Southern Football League seasons
7